Natalia Filippova  (born 7 February 1975) is a former Russian footballer who played as a defender for the Russia women's national football team. She was part of the team at the 1999 FIFA Women's World Cup and the UEFA Women's Euro 2001.

References

External links
 

1975 births
Living people
Russian women's footballers
Russia women's international footballers
Place of birth missing (living people)
1999 FIFA Women's World Cup players
Women's association football defenders
CSK VVS Samara (women's football club) players
Russian Women's Football Championship players
Ryazan-VDV players